Cape Christian is a land point on eastern Baffin Island, in Qikiqtaaluk Region, Nunavut, Canada. The nearest settlement is Clyde River to the north.  Cape Christian was used as a weather station. From 1954 until 1974, it was also an Arctic military site that was run by the U.S. Coast Guard as a LORAN station which supported ships and aircraft that operated out of Thule, Greenland.

References

Peninsulas of Qikiqtaaluk Region